Hervé Prouzet (20 June 1920 – 6 January 2010) was a French racing cyclist. He rode in the 1950 Tour de France.

References

1920 births
2010 deaths
French male cyclists
Place of birth missing